The River class was a class of minesweeper built for the British Royal Navy in the 1980s, designated Fleet Minesweepers (MSF).

Design
The Rivers were built with a traditional steel hull to a design based on a commercial offshore support vessel. The class was designed to be operated as deep sea team sweepers, to combat the threat posed to submarines by Soviet deep-water buoyant moored mines codenamed "Cluster Bay".

The River-class MSF was equipped with the Wire Sweep Mark 9 (WS 9) which was capable of performing Extra Deep Armed Team Sweeping (EDATS). Operating in pairs (or a number of pairs in formation), they towed a sweep between the two ships that followed the profile of the bottom and cut the mooring wires of the mines; these released mines would then be destroyed on the surface with gunfire. The WS 9 was able to be used for "mechanical" sweeping in this manner or "influence" sweeping whereby a transducer was towed through the water generating noise, both acoustic and electro-magnetic, that simulated a larger high value unit. The Rivers were also armed with a single 40 mm Bofors gun on the manually operated World War II-era Mark III mounting, and two L7 GPMGs.

The concept was refined in the chartered trawlers HMS St David and HMS Venturer, and a total of twelve vessels, all named after British rivers, were constructed by Richards (Shipbuilders) Ltd at Lowestoft and Great Yarmouth at an approximate unit cost of £4.6 million. The class was designed to operate in deep water and ocean environments, if necessary, for long periods of time without support. The complement was 5 officers, 7 Senior Ratings, and 16 Junior Ratings, although additional accommodation meant that a total crew of 36 could be borne for training purposes.

Service history
Upon entering service they joined the 10th Mine Countermeasures Squadron based at Rosyth and eleven were assigned to various Royal Naval Reserve (RNR) divisions around the United Kingdom. The twelfth, entered service with the regular Royal Navy. Further cuts followed when the future of the RNR was reviewed in 1993 and as a result the entire class was withdrawn from RNR service.

Ultimately, the entire class was sold to overseas navies.

Ships

References

 Britain's Modern Royal Navy, Paul Beaver, Patrick Stephens Limited, 1996, 
 Rebuilding the Royal Navy : Warship Design Since 1945, D. K. Brown and George Moore, Chatham Publishing, 2003
 
 Mentioned in Parliament
 Mentioned in Parliament

 
Mine warfare vessel classes
 
Ship classes of the Royal Navy